The IOA Golf Classic is a tournament on the Epson Tour, the LPGA's developmental tour. It has been a part of the tour's schedule since 2013. It is held at Alaqua Country Club in Longwood, Florida.

The 2016 event was cancelled due to Hurricane Matthew.

Winners

References

External links

Coverage on Epson Tour website

Symetra Tour events
Golf in Florida
Recurring sporting events established in 2013
2013 establishments in Florida